Chef Ra (October 10, 1950 – December 26, 2006), born Jim Wilson Jr., was a long-time cannabis rights advocate and cannabis foods writer in the United States.  After gaining notoriety as a ganja gourmet and appearing on the November 1987 cover of High Times, he began writing "Chef Ra's Psychedelic Kitchen" in 1988 at the request of magazine editor Steven Hager. Ra was a fixture of Ann Arbor's Hash Bash, speaking out about the benefits of cannabis for 19 consecutive years before his death.

Biography

Early life 
Although he was born Charleston, West Virginia, by high school, Wilson had moved to the Champaign–Urbana metropolitan area. He was the first Black student elected Senior Class President at Urbana High. Wilson was later banned from the football team, even though he had been the starting end and placekicker, because of his association with fellow student Steven Hager, who later hired Wilson to write for High Times.

Writings
Chef Ra's Psychedelic Kitchen column appeared in High Times off and on for 15 years. The articles would weave together Ra's insights on life together with a new ganja recipe. Ra would also report on travels to cannabis culture events.

Filmography
Chef Ra starred in a pair of videos produced by High Times, including Chef Ra Escapes Babylon (1989) and Ganja Gourmet (2003). The former features Ra's visit to Jamaica, and had a rare public screening at the 1998 Freaky Film Festival in Champaign-Urbana. Ra was featured in the short film Bumbaclots in Negril (1999) alongside fellow High Times staffers.

Death
He died of complications from cardiovascular disease on December 26, 2006, at the age of 56.

Further reading

References

External links

, featuring Chef Ra

 , including many photos from the WEFT archives.
Chef Ra MySpace page

1950 births
2006 deaths
American cannabis activists
American food writers
American Rastafarians
Chefs from West Virginia
Writers from Charleston, West Virginia
Activists from West Virginia